Marlborough District Council is the unitary local authority for the Marlborough District of New Zealand.

The council is led by the mayor of Marlborough, who is currently . There are also 13 councillors representing three wards.

Composition

There are seven Blenheim Ward councillors: Brian Dawson, David Croad, Jamie Arbuckle, Jenny Andrews, Mark Peters, Michael Fitzpatrick, and Thelma Sowman.

There are three Marlborough Sounds Ward councillors: deputy mayor Nadine Taylor, Barbara Faulls, and David Oddie.

There are also three Wairau-Awatere Ward councillors: Cynthia Brooks, Francis Maher and Gerald Hope.

History

The council was formed in 1989, replacing Blenheim County Council (1869–1989), Picton Council Council (1876–1989) and Marlborough County (1876–1989).

In 2020, the council had 275 staff, including 43 earning more than $100,000. According to the right-wing Taxpayers' Union think tank, residential rates averaged $2,602.

Committees

The council has the following committees: 

 the Assets and Services Committee, with sub-committees for Civil Defence Emergency Management, Parking, and Regional Transport.
 the Conduct Review Committee.
 the Environment Committee, with subcommittees for Animal Control and Resource Hearings.
 the Planning Finance and Community Committee, with subcommittees for Audit and Risk, the Commercial Events Fund, Grants, Housing for Seniors, Sister Cities, the Small Townships Programme, Te Ao Māori and Youth.

There council also has a District Licensing Committee for alcohol issues, and a Marlborough Regional Forestry Joint Committee with Kaikoura District Council.

References

External links
 Official website

Marlborough Region
Territorial authorities of New Zealand